District 18 of the Oregon State Senate comprises parts of Multnomah and Washington counties, as well as a very small portion of northwestern Clackamas County. It is currently represented by Democrat Ginny Burdick of Portland.

Election results
District boundaries have changed over time, therefore, senators before 2013 may not represent the same constituency as today. From 1993 until 2003, the district covered parts of the western Willamette Valley, and from 2003 until 2013 it covered a slightly different area in the Portland metropolitan area.

References

18
Clackamas County, Oregon
Multnomah County, Oregon
Washington County, Oregon